Styphelia adscendens, commonly known as golden heath, is a species of flowering plant in the heath family Ericaceae and is endemic to south-eastern Australia. It is a prostrate or low-lying shrub with lance-shaped leaves and cream-coloured, pale yellowish-green or reddish flowers arranged singly or in paris in leaf axils.

Description

Taxonomy
Styphelia adscendens was first formally described in 1810 by botanist Robert Brown in Prodromus Florae Novae Hollandiae. The specific epithet (adscendens) means "ascending".

Distribution and habitat
Golden heath grows in scrub, woodland and forest from south of Nerriga in New South Wales, in eastern and western Victoria, in far south-eastern South Australia and in Tasmania.

References

adscendens
Flora of New South Wales
Flora of South Australia
Flora of Tasmania
Flora of Victoria (Australia)
Plants described in 1810